The 1975–76 West Midlands (Regional) League season was the 76th in the history of the West Midlands (Regional) League, an English association football competition for semi-professional and amateur teams based in the West Midlands county, Shropshire, Herefordshire, Worcestershire and southern Staffordshire.

Premier Division

The Premier Division featured all the 16 clubs which competed in the division last season, along with three new clubs:
Gresley Rovers, joined from the Central Alliance
Staffordshire Police, promoted from Division One
VS Rugby, transferred from the United Counties League

League table

References

External links

1975–76
W